The William Gilbert Award is presented annually by the  Geomagnetism and Paleomagnetism section of the American Geophysical Union and is "in recognition of outstanding and unselfish work in magnetism of Earth materials and of the Earth and planets." The awardees are chosen based on demonstrated excellence in: (1) scientific rigor, originality, and impact; (2) leadership and service to the geomagnetism and paleomagnetism research community; and/or (3) development of new cross-disciplinary research areas and methods. Every other year, the award is designated for an early-career scientist. The award is named after William Gilbert who first proposed the concept of a geomagnetic field in De Magnete (published in 1600).

William Gilbert Award Winners
Source: American Geophysical Union

See also
List of geophysicists
 List of geophysics awards
 List of prizes named after people

References

Academic awards
Awards established in 2003
Geophysics awards